William Thaw may refer to:
 William Thaw Sr. (1818–1889), American railroad baron
 William Thaw II (1893–1934), American aviator who fought in World War I